Sicario: Day of the Soldado (also known as Sicario 2: Soldado and Soldado) is a 2018 American action-thriller film directed by Stefano Sollima and written by Taylor Sheridan. A sequel to 2015's Sicario, the film features Benicio del Toro, Josh Brolin, Jeffrey Donovan, and Raoul Trujillo reprising their roles, with Isabela Merced, Manuel Garcia-Rulfo, and Catherine Keener joining the cast. The story relates to the drug war at the U.S.-Mexico border and an attempt by the United States government to incite increased conflict among the cartels.

Sicario: Day of the Soldado was released in the United States and Canada on June 29, 2018, by Sony Pictures Releasing under its Columbia Pictures label, while it was distributed internationally by Lionsgate (excluding Latin America and Spain, where it was distributed by Sony).

The film is dedicated to the memory of Jóhann Jóhannsson, the composer of the first film, who died four months before it came out.

It received generally favorable reviews from critics. A sequel, titled Sicario: Capos, is in development.

Plot
A suicide bombing by ISIS in a Kansas City grocery store kills fifteen people. In response, the United States government orders CIA officer Matt Graver to apply extreme measures to combat Mexican drug cartels who are suspected of having smuggled the terrorists across the U.S.-Mexico border. Graver and the Department of Defense decide the best option is to instigate a war between the major cartels, and Graver recruits operative Alejandro Gillick for the mission. Graver also meets with PMC official Andy Wheeldon to secure mercenaries, helicopters, and encrypted communication equipment in order for the U.S. to maintain plausible deniability while combating the Mexican cartels.

Gillick assassinates a high-profile lawyer of the Matamoros cartel in Mexico City while Graver and his team capture Isabel Reyes, the daughter of the kingpin of the Matamoros rival, Carlos Reyes (who ordered the killing of Gillick's family in earlier events), in a false flag operation.

Graver, Gillick and their team take Isabel to a safe house in Texas. They stage a DEA raid and pretend to rescue her, making her believe that she had been captured by the Matamoros cartel. They take her to an American military base while the team organizes her return to Mexico. They plan to leave her behind in a Mexican Federal Police depot located inside territory controlled by her father's rivals to further escalate the inter-cartel conflict. However, after they cross into Mexico, the corrupt police escort turns against them and attacks the American armored vehicles. In the firefight that ensues, Graver and his team kill 25 Mexican policemen to escape the ambush.

Amidst the chaos, Isabel runs away into the desert. Gillick goes after her alone while the rest of the team returns to the United States. Meanwhile, the American government determines that at least two of the suicide bombers in Kansas City were really domestic terrorists, not foreign nationals, and thus were not smuggled into the United States by the cartels. To quell tensions with Mexico, the Secretary of Defense orders the CIA to abandon the mission. Learning that Isabel witnessed the Americans shooting the Mexican police, the Secretary orders the team to erase all proof of American involvement by killing Isabel and Gillick. Graver in turn warns Gillick and orders him to kill Isabel, but Gillick refuses and turns rogue in order to keep her alive. Both have found shelter at an isolated farm in the desert for the night. Gillick knows that if they stay in Mexico, Isabel will be killed. With few resources, they disguise themselves as illegal immigrants and pay human traffickers to help them re-enter the United States. Graver and his team fly covertly into Mexico on Black Hawks, tracking a GPS device that Gillick has activated and embedded into Isabel's shoe.

At the point of departure for the border, Miguel, a young Mexican-American who has been recruited as a coyote, recognizes Gillick from an encounter in a Texas parking lot two days earlier. He alerts his boss who takes Gillick and Isabel hostage. As a gang initiation, Miguel is forced to shoot a hooded Gillick in the head. Upset by his actions, Miguel abandons the gang and walks off by himself. Graver witnesses the apparent killing of Gillick through live satellite imaging and his team track down and eliminate the Mexican gang, rescuing Isabel. Instead of killing her according to his orders, Graver decides to bring Isabel back to the U.S. and place her in witness protection. Meanwhile, Gillick regains consciousness and discovers he has been shot through the cheek. He is chased by a gang search party but he kills its members by throwing a grenade into the pursuing car.

One year later, a now heavily gang-tattooed Miguel is in the Texas mall where he first saw Gillick. He enters the office of his gang contact but instead finds Gillick waiting for him. Gillick says to an inscrutable Miguel: "So you want to be a sicario? Let's talk about your future."

Cast

Production

In September 2015, Lionsgate commissioned a sequel to Sicario, centering on Benicio del Toro's character. The project was being overseen by writer Taylor Sheridan, with Denis Villeneuve initially involved. In April 2016, producers Molly Smith and Trent Luckinbill said Emily Blunt, del Toro and Josh Brolin would return. By June 1, 2016, Italian director Stefano Sollima had been hired to direct what was now titled Soldado from a script by Sheridan. On October 27, 2016, Catherine Keener was cast in the film, which Lionsgate and Black Label Media financed, and which was produced by Thunder Road's Basil Iwanyk, Black Label's Molly Smith and Thad and Trent Luckinbill, and Edward McDonnell. By November 2016, Blunt was no longer attached. The following month, Isabela Merced, David Castaneda and Manuel Garcia-Rulfo joined the cast. Jeffrey Donovan, who returned as Steve Forsing, said that the story would focus on Forsing, Gillick and Graver "going down into Mexico to basically start a war, on purpose, between the rival Mexican cartels," and described the film as a "stand-alone spin-off" rather than a sequel or prequel. In January 2017, Elijah Rodriguez, Matthew Modine and Ian Bohen also joined the cast. Sheridan said, "if Sicario is a film about the militarization of police and that blending over, this is removing the policing aspect from it."

Principal photography on the film began in New Mexico on November 8, 2016, and then it was shot in Mexico City and Tijuana, Baja California.

Music
Hildur Guðnadóttir composed the score for the film, after collaborating with Jóhann Jóhannsson on the first film as cello soloist. The soundtrack was released by Varese Sarabande Records.

Release
The film was originally set to be released by Lionsgate in the United States, under the title Soldado, but a disagreement between Lionsgate and production company Black Label Media saw the North American distribution rights change to Sony Pictures Releasing through its Columbia Pictures label, who then changed the title to Sicario 2: Soldado (which is the UK title) and then thereafter to Sicario: Day of the Soldado, in the North American market. Sony Pictures distributed the film in the United States, Canada, Latin America and Spain, while Lionsgate distributed it in the United Kingdom, as well as handling international rights to other independent distributors. In August 2017, Sony set the release date for June 29, 2018.

Marketing
On December 19, 2017, the first trailer was released. The second trailer debuted on March 19, 2018, confirming the new title as Sicario: Day of the Soldado. The film was released outside North America under the title Sicario 2: Soldado in some locations, and in Italy, the Philippines and others keeping the initial title of Soldado.

Reception

Box office
Sicario: Day of the Soldado grossed $50.1 million in the United States and Canada, and $25.7 million in other territories, for a total worldwide gross of $75.8 million. The studio has stated the production budget was $35 million, although Deadline Hollywood reported the film cost as high as $45 million before prints and advertising.

In the United States and Canada, Day of the Soldado was released alongside Uncle Drew, and was initially projected to gross around $12 million from 3,055 theaters in its opening weekend. After making $7.5 million on its first day (including $2 million from Thursday night previews), estimates were raised to $19 million. Its debut was ultimately $19.1 million, an improvement over the $12.1 million the first film took in during its wide expansion, and third at the box office that weekend, behind other sequels such as Jurassic World: Fallen Kingdom and Incredibles 2. It fell 61% in its second weekend, to $7.3 million, finishing fifth at the box office.

Critical response
The website's critical consensus reads, "Though less subversive than its predecessor, Sicario: Day of the Soldado succeeds as a stylish, dynamic thriller—even if its amoral machismo makes for grim viewing." On Metacritic, the film has a weighted average score of 61 out of 100, based on 50 critics, indicating "generally favorable reviews". Audiences polled by CinemaScore gave the film an average grade of "B" on an A+ to F scale, down from the first film's "A−".

Varietys Peter Debruge called the film "tense, tough, and shockingly ruthless at times," and wrote, "Soldado may not be as masterful as Villeneuve's original, but it sets up a world of possibilities for elaborating on a complex conflict far too rich to be resolved in two hours' time." Todd McCarthy of The Hollywood Reporter praised the film as a "worthy, rough-and-tough sequel", highlighting the direction, lead performances and Sheridan's script, and saying "Sicario: Day of the Soldado emerges as a dynamic action drama in its own right."

Darren Franich of Entertainment Weekly gave the film a 'B' rating, praising the performance of Del Toro while criticizing the plot, stating: "Alejandro (played by Del Toro) assassinates a cartel functionary in broad daylight... He executes the man, firing his gun exactly 417 times. So Sicario 2 is junk, but it's terrifically stylish junk. Director Stefano Solima has worked in Italian crime thrillers, and he brings a run-and-gun humanity to this, suggesting complexities of border society where the first film defaulted to moody hellscapery".

Time magazine's Stephanie Zacharek found the film to be adequate, though lacking the presence of a character in the sequel as emotive as the one played by Emily Blunt in the original, stating: "There's not a Blunt in sight, though special task force macho men Matt Graver and Alejandro... return. This time their job is to stir up a war between rival Mexican drug cartels; part of the scheme involves kidnapping a drug lord's scrappy teenage daughter. Although she has enough teen-beat orneriness to kick both Matt's and Alejandro's butts, the movie doesn't let her."

In an opinion piece for NBC News, Ani Bundel called the film "as implausible as it is irresponsible" and criticized the use of negative stereotypes, concluding that the film "is the worst kind of propaganda, in that it probably doesn’t even realize just how harmful it really is." Monica Castillo at IndieWire describes the first film as an unsympathetic portrayal of Mexicans, and compares the sequel to state-sanctioned propaganda, decrying the "xenophobic absurdity" of it.

Sequel
In June 2018, prior to the release of Soldado, producer Trent Luckinbill stated that a third film is in development. In January 2021, it was noted that the producers hoped to start filming of a third installment in the spring or summer of that year. It was revealed that the third film will be named Sicario: Capos. In February 2021, producer Molly Smith said the film was still in development.

See also

 Mexico-United States relations
 Coyote (person)
 List of films featuring the deaf and hard of hearing

References

External links
 
 
 
 
 
 

Sicario (film series)
2018 films
2018 action thriller films
2010s Spanish-language films
American action thriller films
American sequel films
Black Label Media films
Columbia Pictures films
Lionsgate films
Films about the Federal Bureau of Investigation
Films about the Central Intelligence Agency
Films about drugs
Films about Mexican drug cartels
Films about terrorism
Films about witness protection
Films directed by Stefano Sollima
Films produced by Basil Iwanyk
Films scored by Hildur Guðnadóttir
Films set in Mexico City
Films set in New Mexico
Films set in Texas
Films shot in New Mexico
Films with screenplays by Taylor Sheridan
Thunder Road Films films
Spanish-language American films
2010s English-language films
2010s American films
2010s Mexican films